Larroque (meaning the rock) is a commune in the Tarn department in southern France.

Geography
The village lies in the middle of the commune, on the right bank of the Vère, which flows northwestward through the commune.

See also
Communes of the Tarn department

References

Communes of Tarn (department)